Secret Life, The Secret Life or The Secret Life of... may refer to:

Music
Secret Life (band), an English R&B/house and pop band from the 1990s
The Secret Life Of... (album), an album by The Veronicas
"Secret Life", a song by Debbie Harry from Rockbird
"Secret Life", a song by Soft Cell from Non-Stop Erotic Cabaret
"Secret Life", a song by The Corrs from Forgiven, Not Forgotten

Television
The Secret Life of the American Teenager, an American teen drama starring Shailene Woodley
The Secret Life of Machines, a factual UK television show
The Secret Life of Us, an Australian drama series produced from 2001 to 2005
 The Secret Life Of... (TV series), a television food/cookery show on the US Food Network
The Secret Life of Pets, a film in 2016

Literature
The Secret Life of Bees, a 2002 novel by Sue Monk Kidd
The Secret Life of Bees (film), a 2008 adaption of the novel
 "The Secret Life of Walter Mitty," a 1939 short story by James Thurber
 The Secret Life of Walter Mitty (1947 film), a film loosely based on Thurber's story starring Danny Kaye
 The Secret Life of Walter Mitty (2013 film), a film starring Ben Stiller
The Secret Life of Salvador Dalí, an autobiography by Salvador Dalí published in 1944

Other uses
 The Secret Life: Jeffrey Dahmer, a 1993 film by David R. Bowen
 The Secret Life, a play by Harley Granville-Barker

See also
 My Secret Life (disambiguation)
 Secret Lives (disambiguation)